The Canadian International AutoShow (CIAS) is Canada's largest auto show. This event has been held in Toronto, Ontario since 1974 and is staged annually in February at the Metro Toronto Convention Centre. It draws an average of 300,000 visitors throughout its showing from Ontario and Western New York.

The Canadian International AutoShow in partnership with Toronto Star and Wheels.ca exhibits over 1,000 cars, trucks, and SUVs as well as, concept cars, exotics, classics, and alternative energy vehicles. Toronto Star and Wheels.ca is the presenting Title Sponsor and Show Program Publisher of the Canadian International AutoShow. The AutoShow also rents booths to over 125 exhibitors promoting contests, products, services and even locally owned vehicles.

The 2021 and 2022 editions of the event, were cancelled due to the COVID-19 pandemic.

References

External links

 Official website.

Recurring events established in 1974
Auto shows in Canada
1974 establishments in Canada
Winter events in Canada